The Tigerfibel and Pantherfibel were crew instruction manuals for the German tanks of World War II, the Panzer VI Tiger heavy tank and the Panzer V Panther medium tank.

Like other manuals designated as Fibel (basic primer), they summarised what the crew needed to know for day-to-day use of the tank, but unlike  the typical tedious style of a German tank manual of that period, it is well illustrated in a comic style and much of the text is written as humorous poetry.

The manuals were approved by Heinz Guderian, the Inspector-General of Panzer troops.  In the case of the Panther manual, he issued his approval in the manual's rhyming style, ending with the words, Die Pantherfibel ist genehmigt; wer sie nicht kennt, der wird erledigt (roughly "The Panther primer is approved; who knows it not will be removed." )

In the same manner other comic-style-manuals were published by the German forces:

References
Brand, Wulf-D.: Tigerfibel, Teutonia publications, 1997.

External links
Flip-thru the complete Tigerfibel online with translations along with a short history
Tigerfibel Download
Tigerfiebel Download (zip file)
Pantherfibel Download

Military training books